Stride Toward Freedom: The Montgomery Story (published 1958) is Martin Luther King Jr.'s historic account of the 1955–1956 Montgomery bus boycott. The book describes the conditions of African Americans living in Alabama during the era, and chronicles the events and participants' planning and thoughts about the boycott and its aftermath.

Pilgrimage to Nonviolence 
In the chapter "Pilgrimage to Nonviolence", King outlined his understanding of nonviolence, which seeks to win an opponent to friendship, rather than to humiliate or defeat him. The chapter draws from an address by Wofford, with Rustin and Stanley Levison also providing guidance and ghostwriting.

See also 
 Martin Luther King and the Montgomery Story

References

External sources
Stanford University Encyclopedia entry on the volume


1958 non-fiction books
Works by Martin Luther King Jr.
Harper & Brothers books
Books about activism